Komajin (also Romanized as Komājīn; also known as Komājīn Yeylāq) is a village in Howmeh Rural District, in the Central District of Abhar County, Zanjan Province, Iran. At the 2006 census, its population was 20, in 6 families.

References 

Populated places in Abhar County